Bygland is the administrative centre of Bygland municipality in Agder county, Norway. The village is located on the eastern shore of the lake Byglandsfjorden, near the northern end of the lake. The village is the site of the municipal government, old-age home, medical clinic, and Bygland Church. There is a private Christian high school, KVS Bygland, that is located in this village.

References

Villages in Agder
Bygland